Xie Bangzhi (1916 – January 28, 2008) was a Chinese diplomat. He was born in Heilongjiang. He was Ambassador of the People's Republic of China to Bulgaria (1962–1967), Afghanistan (1969–1973), Upper Volta (1973–1978) and Finland (1979–1980). He was President of Shanghai Jiao Tong University.

1916 births
2008 deaths
Presidents of Shanghai Jiao Tong University
Ambassadors of China to Bulgaria
Ambassadors of China to Afghanistan
Ambassadors of China to Burkina Faso
Ambassadors of China to Finland
People from Harbin
Academic staff of Shanghai Jiao Tong University
Educators from Heilongjiang